The following is a list of women architects in California by region – notable women who are well known for their work in the field of architecture, landscape architecture, urban design, and preservation.

Northern California 
Northern California includes San Jose, San Francisco, Oakland, Sacramento, and Metropolitan Fresno.
 Helen Findlay Aycrigg 
 Esther Baum Born 
Sydney Baumgartner  
 Elizabeth Boyter 
 Lilian Bridgman
 Ella Castelhun
 Louise Clever 
 Edna Deakin
 Audrey Emmons 
Dorothy Ward Erskine
 Anne Fougeron
 Helen French 
 Arabelle Hufbauer 
 Vera Jansone 
 Grace Jewett
 Lois Kartwold 
 Michelle Kaufmann
 Evelyn Kosmak 
 Katherine Lambert 
 Roslyn Lindheim 
 Julia Morgan
 Gertrude Comfort Morrow
 Hilde Reiss 
 Rebecca Wood Esherick Watkin
 Beverly Willis
 Lois Wilson Worley

Southern California 
Southern California can include the counties of Imperial, Kern, Los Angeles, Orange, Riverside, San Bernardino, San Diego, San Luis Obispo, Santa Barbara, and Ventura.
 Katherine Bashford
 Barbara Bestor
 Ingalill Wahlroos-Ritter
Linda Taalman  
Catherine Herbst 
 Cory Buckner
 Jeanine Centuori
 Olive K. Chadeayne
 Annie Chu
 Mary Colter
 Isabelle Duvuvier
 Ray Eames
Dora Epstein-Jones 
 Greta Grossman 
Doreen Gehry Nelson 
 Helen Liu Fong
 Mia Lehrer
 Mehrnoosh Mojallali
 Edith Northman
 Iris Anna Regn
 Lilian Rice
 Lutah Maria Riggs
 Ruth Shellhorn
 Paulette Singley
 Norma Merrick Sklarek
 Hazel Wood
 Florence Yoch
 Liane Zimbler
 Anne Zimmerman
 Jennifer Siegal
 Julie Eizenberg
Mary McLaughlin Craig

References 

California women architects
American women architects
Architectural conservation
Women landscape architects
Urban design
architects
California women
Lists of women by occupation